Allen Hopkins (or similar) may refer to:

Allen Hopkins (pool player) (born 1951), professional pool (pocket billiards) player and commentator for ESPN
Allen Hopkins (soccer commentator), football (soccer) commentator for the Los Angeles Galaxy team, and sideline reporter for ESPN's MLS Primetime Thursday
Allan Hopkins, Australian rules footballer
Alan Hopkins, British politician